The Mausam River (Mosam River, Mokshaganga River) is a river in Nashik District in Maharashtra, India. It is a left tributary of the Girna River.

Course
The Mosam River arises in the Western Ghats, above the village of Golwad, Baglan Taluka, in northern Nashik District, just south of the border with Dhule District. The river flows east and is dammed at Haranbari Dam, with Vide Digar on the right bank (south) and Jaitapur on the left bank (north).

Notes

Rivers of Maharashtra
Tributaries of the Tapti River
Rivers of India